Galloisiana notabilis is a species of insect in the family Grylloblattidae that is endemic to southern Japan. Its type locality is Nagasaki Prefecture, Japan.

Habitat
Galloisiana notabilis is a fossorial species that prefers rocky stream banks. It is one of the few grylloblattids found in low-elevation environments with hot summers. Galloisiana chujoi is the only other known grylloblattid species that is also found in Kyushu.

References

Grylloblattidae
Insects of Japan
Endemic fauna of Japan